North Highlands is a census-designated place (CDP) in Sacramento County, California, United States. It is part of the Sacramento–Arden-Arcade–Roseville Metropolitan Statistical Area. The population was 42,694 at the 2010 census, down from 44,187 at the 2000 census.

Geography
North Highlands is located at  (38.673003, -121.372698).

Climate
According to the Köppen Climate Classification system, North Highlands has a hot-summer Mediterranean climate, abbreviated "Csa" on climate maps.

Information 
Until 2008, North Highlands was served by two school districts, Rio Linda Union School District which covered K-6 grades and Grant Joint Union High School District for grades 7-12.  In 2008, the two districts merged, creating the Twin Rivers Unified School District. The local high school is Highlands High School, which is surrounded by quite a few elementary and charter schools. North Highlands is a low-income residential housing area with some commercial and industrial regions around the former McClellan Air Force Base, now a civilian business center and airport called McClellan Business Park. In 1995, McClellan Air Force Base was identified for closure as part of the Base Realignment and Closure (BRAC) IV process. North Highlands has a high crime rate for an area of its size, and a homicide rate four times the city itself. The main streets are Watt Avenue, Elkhorn Blvd,  and Walerga Road.

Demographics

2010
The 2010 United States Census reported that North Highlands had a population of 42,694. The racial makeup of North Highlands was 27,000 (63.2%) White, 4,883 (11.4%) African American, 603 (1.4%) Native American, 2,067 (4.8%) Asian, 300 (0.7%) Pacific Islander, 4,709 (11.0%) from other races, and 3,132 (7.3%) from two or more races. Hispanic or Latino of any race were 10,077 persons (23.6%).

The Census reported that 42,433 people (99.4% of the population) lived in households, 90 (0.2%) lived in non-institutionalized group quarters, and 171 (0.4%) were institutionalized.

There were 14,542 households, out of which 5,713 (39.3%) had children under the age of 18 living in them, 5,825 (40.1%) were opposite-sex married couples living together, 2,979 (20.5%) had a female householder with no husband present, 1,170 (8.0%) had a male householder with no wife present.  There were 1,295 (8.9%) unmarried opposite-sex partnerships, and 116 (0.8%) same-sex married couples or partnerships. 3,376 households (23.2%) were made up of individuals, and 1,144 (7.9%) had someone living alone who was 65 years of age or older. The average household size was 2.92.  There were 9,974 families (68.6% of all households); the average family size was 3.44.

The population was spread out, with 11,836 people (27.7%) under the age of 18, 4,904 people (11.5%) aged 18 to 24, 11,385 people (26.7%) aged 25 to 44, 9,825 people (23.0%) aged 45 to 64, and 4,744 people (11.1%) who were 65 years of age or older.  The median age was 32.1 years. For every 100 females, there were 96.0 males.  For every 100 females age 18 and over, there were 92.2 males.

The homeowner vacancy rate was 3.5%; the rental vacancy rate was 10.6%.  19,763 people (46.3% of the population) lived in owner-occupied housing units and 22,670 people (53.1%) lived in rental housing units.

2000
As of the census of 2000, there were 44,187 people, 15,389 households, and 10,741 families residing in the CDP. The racial makeup of the CDP was 30,003 (67.9%) White, 4,920 (11.1%) African American, 616 (1.4%) Native American, 2,515 (5.7%) Asian, 250 (0.5%) Pacific Islander, 2,708 (6.1%) from other races, and 3,182 (7.2%) from two or more races. Hispanic or Latino of any race were 6,695 (15.2%) of the population.

There were 15,389 households, out of which 37.2% had children under the age of 18 living with them, 42.4% were married couples living together, 20.0% had a female householder with no husband present, and 30.2% were non-families. 22.8% of all households were made up of individuals, and 7.0% had someone living alone who was 65 years of age or older.  The average household size was 2.83 and the average family size was 3.31.

In the CDP, the population was spread out, with 30.9% under the age of 18, 11.0% from 18 to 24, 29.5% from 25 to 44, 17.9% from 45 to 64, and 10.8% who were 65 years of age or older.  The median age was 30 years. For every 100 females, there were 94.9 males.  For every 100 females age 18 and over, there were 91.4 males.

The median income for a household in the CDP was $32,278, and the median income for a family was $32,855. Males had a median income of $28,159 versus $24,996 for females. The per capita income for the CDP was $14,109.  About 18.6% of families and 22.8% of the population were below the poverty line, including 33.8% of those under age 18 and 7.4% of those age 65 or over.

Government

In the United States House of Representatives, North Highlands is in California's 6th congressional district.

Notable residents
Scott Galbraith, NFL player, Super Bowl XXVIII champion
Sasha Grey, pornographic actress
Brian Lewis, gold medalist, 2000 Sydney Olympics
Jeremy Powell, pro baseball player, minor league coach
Jimmy Zavala, musician, songwriter, producer

References

Census-designated places in Sacramento County, California
Census-designated places in California
Ukrainian communities in the United States